KCKP (100.9 FM) is a radio station licensed to serve the community of Laurie, Missouri. The station is owned by Lake Area Educational Broadcasting Foundation. It airs a Christian contemporary hit radio music format.

The station was assigned the KCKP call letters by the Federal Communications Commission on August 19, 2011.

References

External links
 Official Website
 

CKP
Contemporary Christian radio stations in the United States
Radio stations established in 2014
2014 establishments in Missouri
Morgan County, Missouri
Camden County, Missouri